Remixes & Rarities is a compilation album containing rare songs and previously unreleased remixes by UK band, Temposhark, a project of singer/songwriter Robert Diament.

It was released in October 2009 as a digital download. The digital version of the album includes a PDF downloadable artwork file. The album contains 20 tracks of remixes of songs taken from The Invisible Line alongside rare songs and b-sides made during the recording process of their debut album.

Diament commented on his decision to release the album,

Track listing
 "Paris (feat. Princess Julia)" – 3:18
 "Not That Big (Metronomy Remix)" – 3:22
 "Neon Question Mark" – 3:07
 "Bang (Akira The Don Remix)" – 2:58
 "The Coffee Girl" – 3:31
 "I Kissed A Girl (The Selector Live Session)" – 2:39
 "Blame (Banished to Frigia Remix)" – 4:52
 "Knock Me Out (Napsugar Remix)" – 7:12
 "Crime (Masashi Naka Remix)" – 6:14
 "Lemonade" – 2:16
 "Invisible Ink (Avril Remix)" – 5:49
 "Neon Question Mark (Border Crossing Remix)" – 4:25
 "Crime (Noblesse Oblige Remix)" - 5:13
 "Hard, Medium, Soft" – 4:02
 "Blame (Milosh Remix)" – 4:30
 "Little White Lie (Cursor Miner Remix)" – 6:28
 "Joy (Melnyk Remix)" – 7:47
 "Knock Me Out (Karin Ström Remix)" – 3:31
 "Snow" – 2:57
 "Switch Off" - 4:19

References 

Temposhark albums
2009 compilation albums
2009 remix albums